The Andreanof Islands are a group of islands in the Aleutian Islands in southwestern Alaska. They are located at about 52° North and 172°57' to 179°09' West.

Geography
The Andreanof Islands are located between Amchitka Pass and the Rat Islands group to the west, and Amukta Pass and the Islands of Four Mountains group to the east.  The islands extend about 275 miles (440 km). The total land area of all islands (including the Delarof Islands) is 1,515.349 sq mi (3,924.737 km2).

The total population was 412 persons as of the 2000 census, the vast majority in the city of Adak on Adak Island.

Islands
The Delarof Islands are a subgroup of the Andreanof Islands group as well as the westernmost islands in the group.

The largest islands in the group are, from west to east, Gareloi Island, Tanaga Island, Kanaga, Adak Island, Kagalaska Island, Great Sitkin Island, Atka Island, Amlia, and Seguam Island.

The islands are usually foggy and are treeless because of the almost constant wind.

History
The Andreanof Islands were named for the Russian navigator, Andreyan (Hadrian) Tolstykh, who was the first European to explore the islands in 1761.

There were several United States military bases on the islands during World War II. The bases on Adak were enlarged and made permanent after the war but were closed in 1995.

See also
1957 Andreanof Islands earthquake

References

Andreanof Islands: Blocks 1083 thru 1137, Census Tract 1, Aleutians West Census Area, Alaska United States Census Bureau

 
Islands of Aleutians West Census Area, Alaska
Islands of the Aleutian Islands
Islands of Alaska
Islands of Unorganized Borough, Alaska